A net gun is a non-lethal weapon designed to fire a net which entangles the target. Net guns have a long history of being used to capture wildlife and stray dogs. A net gun is currently also in development that will be able to subdue humans.

In popular culture
Net guns are becoming increasingly popular in both fiction and non-fiction settings, often seen as an "easy-fix" weapon for capturing a target without causing serious harm to it.

One notable example of a net gun is used in the Predator series of films, most notably Predator 2 and Alien vs. Predator. This version is somewhat lethal, as it tightens around the target and cuts them like razor wire. Other examples include the films Total Recall, The Running Man and Escape from L.A., in which a net gun is used to capture the protagonist. The net gun used in the latter two references, as well as I, Robot is a real item. 

In "Birds in a Truck", an episode of the Discovery Channel television series MythBusters, Jamie Hyneman constructs a jury-rigged net gun using PVC, an air tank, a fishing net, and some tennis balls in an attempt to capture pigeons. The net gun functioned as planned, but Jamie failed to catch any of the pigeons. A net gun was also seen on the MTV television series, Rob and Big, as a means of non-lethal home protection from unwanted intruders. After one was featured on Rob and Big, internet searches for net guns drastically increased.

The term has lately been adopted for fantasy weapons used in imaginary or text-based combat. These fantasy weapons work in the same way as real-world net guns: an explosive charge or compressed air propels a weighted net toward a target. The net envelops the target and immobilizes it.

References

Non-lethal firearms
Nets (devices)
Paramilitary weapons